Old Urban Cemetery, also known as Cementerio Municipal, in Aguadilla, Puerto Rico, is a cemetery with burials dating back to 1813 or 1814. Near the town of Aguadilla's north entrance, it spreads between the beach and the foot of the mountain, and is enclosed by mortar and stone walls. Many of its older tombs, made of brick, stone and mortar, were damaged in a 1918 earthquake (presumably the 1918 San Fermín earthquake).

Use of the cemetery began when burials were no longer allowed in the churchyard. Graves include that of poet-laureat José de Jesús Esteves, painter Rafael Arroyo Gely, and  Luis R. Esteves (the first Puerto Rican graduate of West Point).

The cemetery was originally divided into sections for Catholics and non-Catholics.
It was listed on the National Register of Historic Places in 1985.

See also
 National Register of Historic Places listings in western Puerto Rico

References

External links
 

Cemeteries on the National Register of Historic Places in Puerto Rico
1813 establishments in Puerto Rico
National Register of Historic Places in Aguadilla, Puerto Rico